Stenozygum is a genus of stink bugs in the family Pentatomidae. It is widely distributed in Australian-Melanesian, Oriental, Palearctic and Ethiopian regions.

Description
Species in the genus Stenozygum are associated with plants like Capparis, Medicago sativa, and Brassica campestris. The genus is differentiated based on the male genitalia. There are about 40 species across the tropical Palaearctic, Ethiopian, Oriental and Australian-Melanesian Regions. Two subgenera Stenozygum and Setozygum just  are separated based on the whether the jugum is longer than the clypeus (the latter) and the presence of setae on the inner lobe of the pygophore.

Selected species
Subgenus Stenozygum
 Stenozygum alienatum
 Stenozygum coloratum 
 Stenozygum gemmeum  Indonesia
 Stenozygum ignitum
 Stenozygum jordiribesi  - Socotra
 Stenozygum lepidum (Walker) Indonesia
 Stenozygum meridionale Gross Australia
 Stenozygum miniatulum Distant Australia
 Stenozygum pakistanense Gilgit, Pakistan
 Stenozygum speciosum (Dallas) India, Sindh and Punjab in Pakistan
 Stenozygum woodwardi Fiji 
Subgenus Setozygum
 Stenozygum pseudospeciosum Ghauri, 1972 Pakistan
 Stenozygum constrictum Ahmad and Khan, 1983. - Punjab and Sindh Pakistan

References

Pentatominae
Hemiptera genera